Anne Christine Winters (born June 3, 1994) is an American actress. She has played roles in the FX's series Tyrant as Emma Al-Fayeed, ABC's series Wicked City as Vicki Roth, and Netflix's series 13 Reasons Why as Chlöe Rice. She also starred in the films Sand Castles (2014), Pass the Light (2015), The Bride He Bought Online (2015), Mom and Dad (2017), and Night School (2018).

In 2017, she began starring as cancer patient Mia Phillips in go90's drama series Zac & Mia, for which she won the 2018 Daytime Emmy Award for Outstanding Lead Actress in a Digital Daytime Drama Series. In the 2022 third season of the Hulu science fiction series The Orville, she played the role of Ensign Charly Burke.

Early life
Anne Christine Winters was born in Dallas, Texas, to Karen and Harry Winters. She grew up in nearby Lewisville. Winters was educated at Prestonwood Christian Academy, a private Baptist school in Plano. When she was ten years old, Winters sang a solo at the American Airlines Center to a crowd of over 24,000 people. She originally planned to attend Southern Methodist University for her college education, but chose instead to relocate to Los Angeles in order to pursue her acting career.

Career
Winters made her film debut as Young Kathleen in the straight-to-DVD film A Christmas Snow. She then appeared in the straight-to-DVD film Cooper and the Castle Hills Gang. In 2013, she guest starred in the Disney Channel sitcom Liv and Maddie as Kylie Kramer, appearing in the episode "Steal-A-Rooney". From 2013 to 2014, Winters had a recurring role as Kelsey in the ABC Family/Freeform drama series The Fosters.

From 2014 to 2016, Winters starred in the regular role of Emma Al-Fayeed in the drama series Tyrant, created by Gideon Raff for the FX network. She was credited as a guest star during Tyrant second season, appearing in only four of the 13 episodes, and continued her role in the third season. Winters starred in a leading role in the 2014 independent drama film, Sand Castles, directed by Clenét Verdi-Rose,  opposite actors Jordon Hodges and Clint Howard. She won the Leonardo da Vinci Horse Award for Best Ensemble Cast at the MIFF Awards with her co-stars. Also in 2014, Winters starred as Kelly Decker in the action film Fatal Instinct.

In 2015, she appeared as Gwen in the faith-based film Pass the Light, directed by Malcolm Goodwin. She also starred as Avery Lindstrom in the Lifetime television film The Bride He Bought Online, directed by Christine Conradt. That same year, she was cast as Vicki Roth in ABC's crime drama series Wicked City. Winters co-starred as Valerie York in the NBC pilot sequel to the teen drama film Cruel Intentions, alongside the film's original star Sarah Michelle Gellar. Winters won Best Supporting Actress at the 2016 Nice International Film Festival for her role in the drama film The Tribe.

In 2017, she appeared opposite Nicolas Cage and Selma Blair in the horror comedy film Mom and Dad, directed by Brian Taylor. Since 2017, Winters has had a lead role in the AwesomenessTV and go90 drama series Zac & Mia, portraying teenage cancer patient Mia Phillips. She won the 2018 Daytime Emmy Award for Outstanding Lead Actress in a Digital Daytime Drama Series for her performance in the role.

Winters portrayed Chlöe Rice, the new head cheerleader and "it" girl of Liberty High in a recurring role of the second, third, and fourth seasons of Netflix's drama series 13 Reasons Why, and appeared in the 2018 comedy film Night School, directed by Malcolm D. Lee. She has been cast in the ABC drama series Grand Hotel.

In 2022, she appeared in season 3 of The Orville, as new season regular, Charly Burke.

Filmography

Film

Television

Awards and nominations

References

External links

 
 
 

1994 births
21st-century American actresses
Actresses from Dallas
Actresses from Los Angeles
American child actresses
American film actresses
American television actresses
Baptists from Texas
Living people
People from Lewisville, Texas